Crematogaster atkinsoni is a species of ant in tribe Crematogastrini. It was described by Wheeler in 1919.

References

atkinsoni
Insects described in 1919